Aponoea is a genus of moth in the family Gelechiidae.

Species
Aponoea obtusipalpis Walsingham, 1905
Aponoea pruinosella Chrétien, 1915

References

Chelariini
Moth genera